Cyclostephanos is a genus of diatoms belonging to the family Stephanodiscaceae.

The genus has cosmopolitan distribution.

Species:

Cyclostephanos costatus 
Cyclostephanos fenestratus 
Cyclostephanos gasseae

References

Thalassiosirales
Diatom genera